In Search of Perfect Consonance《尋找完美第五度》is a short documentary film directed by Oscar-winning Chinese-American filmmaker Ruby Yang. It profiles the Asian Youth Orchestra (AYO) established 25 years ago to promote peace in the region. The film explores the 25-year history of AYO and its origins whilst focusing on the friendships and deep bonds created between current members to further highlight the theme of peace through music. The film premiered in Hong Kong cinemas on 17 July 2016.

Synopsis 

In Search of Perfect Consonance profiles the Asian Youth Orchestra from its establishment in 1987 to its 25th anniversary in 2016.  China and Vietnam were engaged in a long and violent border war, relations between China and Japan were frosty with tensions running high across the Strait of Taiwan. These events inspired Richard Pontzious to establish the Asian Youth Orchestra in Hong Kong with the support of world renowned musicians such as the great violinist Yehudi Menuhin who eventually became co founder and conducted the first concerts in 1990. From its humble beginnings the orchestra aimed to connect the region's aspiring young musicians in a bid to promote peace through music and has trained more than 2,000 musicians from across Asia throughout its 25-year history.

The film follows today's young musicians from Asian Youth Orchestra during an intense summer program of rehearsals and  a three-week concert tour of Asia. Selected from thousands of applicants across the region the students overcame national and cultural differences learnt to listen and work with their fellow musicians allowing them to reconnect with their shared passion for music, a passion that not only allows their talents to bloom, but also creates deep bonds between them. The close bonds between musicians are at the heart of the Asian Youth Orchestra and forms the basis of the story explored in the film whilst delving into the origins and inspirations behind the creation of the Asian Youth Orchestra with a hope of uniting Asia through a common passion for classical music. Therefore, it seems appropriate that the piece being prepared by the young orchestra for their three-week concert tour is nothing less than the last movement of Beethoven's 9th. One that emphasizes brotherhood and, as young Taiwanese bass trombonist Shao Hua Wu says, is “full of hope”.

Production 
Filming took place in the summer of 2015, commencing in June and concluded in the middle of August. Majority of filming took place in Hong Kong at multiple locations such as the Hong Kong Colliseum, the Peak and the Hong Kong Academy of Performing Arts. Additional footage was filmed at the Tokyo City Concert Hall during the final performance of their three-week concert tour of Asia.

Additional Information

About the director and producer 
Director Ruby Yang's recent works have mainly focused on social issues in mainland China, such as The Blood of Yingzhou District, which won the 2006 Academy Award for Best Documentary Short Subject and The Warriors of Qiugang, which was nominated Academy Award for Best Documentary Short Subject in 2011. Yang also directed and produced My Voice, My Life, a feature-length documentary that opened in 13 theatres across Hong Kong and Macau. The Wall Street Journal named it "Hong Kong’s five most-notable films of 2014. It won the 2015 NPT Human Spirit Award at the Nashville Film Festival and was selected by film critic societies from Hong Kong, Taiwan and Mainland China as "one of the ten best Chinese-language films of 2014".

About the Asian Youth Orchestra 
Set up in 1987, the Asian Youth Orchestra is the brainchild of artistic director Richard Pontzious whose vision was to create an orchestra that united the region whilst celebrating the excellence of aspiring Asian musicians. The orchestra quickly gathered support from distinguished musicians across the globe including violinist Yehudi Menuhin and played its very first concert at the Kumamoto Music Festival in Japan in 1990. Each year,  thousands of aspiring musicians from across Asia audition for a place in the orchestra and over its rich 25-year history, the Asian Youth Orchestra has 2000 young musicians with many having successful careers in music and becoming messengers of peace in Asia.

Since its inception the Asian youth Orchestra has given more than 350 performances in some of the world's top venues, reaching over a million concertgoers. Finally the orchestra was described as the “finest among youth orchestras around the world” by the San Francisco Chronicle

References

External links 
 In Search of Perfect Consonance, official website
 
 Asian Youth Orchestra, official website

2016 films
Films directed by Ruby Yang
Documentary films about Asia
Documentary films about classical music and musicians
2016 short documentary films
2010s English-language films
Hong Kong short films
Hong Kong documentary films